The 2012–13 FC Red Bull Salzburg season was the 80th season in club history. Red Bull Salzburg finished the season in 2nd place, 5 points behind champions Austria Wien. In the Austrian Cup, Salzburg reached the semifinals were they were defeated by Pasching, whilst in the UEFA Champions League, Salzburg where knocked out on the Away goals rule by F91 Dudelange in the Second Qualifying Round.

Review and events
On 15 June 2012, Ricardo Moniz resigned as manager of Red Bull Salzburg. Piet Hamberg was the caretaker manager while the club searched for a new head coach. The new manager is Roger Schmidt. Ralf Rangnick was hired as Sporting Director. Leonardo was released by the club after he criticized Stefan Maierhofer in an interview.

Squad

Out on loan

Left during the season

Transfers

In

 Transfers announced on the above date, being finalised on 1 January 2013.

Out

Loans out

Released

Friendlies

Competitions

Overview

Bundesliga

League table

Results summary

Results by round

Results

Austrian Cup

UEFA Champions League

Qualifying rounds

Statistics

Appearances and goals

|-
|colspan="14"|Players away on loan :

|-
|colspan="14"|Players who left Red Bull Salzburg during the season:

|}

Goal scorers

Clean sheets

Disciplinary Record

Notes

References

Red Bull Salzburg
Red Bull Salzburg
2012-13 Red Bull Salzburg Season